In number theory, Lemoine's conjecture, named after Émile Lemoine, also known as Levy's conjecture, after Hyman Levy, states that all odd integers greater than 5 can be represented as the sum of an odd prime number and an even semiprime.

History
The conjecture was posed by Émile Lemoine in 1895, but was erroneously attributed by MathWorld to Hyman Levy who pondered it in the 1960s.

A similar conjecture by  Sun in 2008 states that all odd integers greater than 3 can be represented as the sum of a prime number and the product of two consecutive positive integers ( p+x(x+1) ).

Formal definition
To put it algebraically, 2n + 1 = p + 2q always has a solution in primes p and q (not necessarily distinct) for n > 2. The Lemoine conjecture is similar to but stronger than Goldbach's weak conjecture.

Example
For example, 47 = 13 + 2 × 17 = 37 + 2 × 5 = 41 + 2 × 3 = 43 + 2 × 2.  counts how many different ways 2n + 1 can be represented as p + 2q.

Evidence
According to MathWorld, the conjecture has been verified by Corbitt up to 109. A blog post in June of 2019 additionally claimed to have verified the conjecture up to 1010.

See also
 Lemoine's conjecture and extensions

Notes

References
 Emile Lemoine, L'intermédiare des mathématiciens, 1 (1894), 179; ibid 3 (1896), 151.
 H. Levy, "On Goldbach's Conjecture", Math. Gaz. 47 (1963): 274
 L. Hodges, "A lesser-known Goldbach conjecture", Math. Mag., 66 (1993): 45–47. . 
 John O. Kiltinen and Peter B. Young, "Goldbach, Lemoine, and a Know/Don't Know Problem", Mathematics Magazine, 58(4) (Sep., 1985), pp. 195–203. . 
 Richard K. Guy, Unsolved Problems in Number Theory New York: Springer-Verlag 2004: C1

External links 
 Levy's Conjecture by  Jay Warendorff, Wolfram Demonstrations Project.

Additive number theory
Conjectures about prime numbers
Unsolved problems in number theory